Syntrophobacter fumaroxidans is a species of syntrophic propionate-degrading sulfate-reducing bacterium. Strain MPOBT (= DSM 10017T) is the type strain. Its genome has been fully sequenced.

References

Further reading

External links
J.P. Euzéby: List of Prokaryotic names with Standing in Nomenclature

Type strain of Syntrophobacter fumaroxidans at BacDive -  the Bacterial Diversity Metadatabase

Thermodesulfobacteriota
Bacteria described in 1998